The Union Seminary Quarterly Review was a quarterly peer-reviewed academic journal covering theology.

The Union Seminary Quarterly Review published its first issue in 1945. The masthead page of the first issue announced the journal as a replacement for the student-published Union Review (which ran from 1939 to 1945) and the Alumni Bulletin.   The journal ran until 2016. The last editor-in-chief was Jason Wyman.

References

External links 
 

Religious studies journals
Publications established in 1939
English-language journals
Quarterly journals
Academic journals edited by students